Throughout the history of gloved boxing styles, techniques and strategies have changed to varying degrees. Ring conditions, promoter demands, teaching techniques, and the influence of successful boxers are some of the reasons styles and strategies have fluctuated.

Boxing styles

Primary styles
There are four generally accepted boxing styles that are used to define fighters. These are the swarmer, out-boxer, brawler, and boxer-puncher. Many boxers do not always fit into these categories, and it is not uncommon for a fighter to change their style over a period of time.

Swarmer 
The swarmer (in-fighter, crowder, or pressure-fighter) is a fighter who attempts to overwhelm his opponent by applying constant pressure—taking away an opponent's usually superior reach. Swarmers tend to have very good head movement in order to get inside. Good power, a good chin, and a tremendous punch output are required, resulting in a great need for stamina and conditioning. This style favors closing inside an opponent, overwhelming them with intensity and flurries of hooks and uppercuts in mid-range or turning it into an inside battle where they pummel their opponents from close-range. They tend to be fast on their feet which can make them difficult to evade for a slower fighter; or are great at cutting off the ring with precise footwork. They also tend to have a good "chin" because this style usually involves being hit with many jabs before they can maneuver inside where they are more effective. Many swarmers are often either shorter fighters or fighters with shorter reaches, especially in the heavier classes, that have to get in close to be effective.

Commonly known swarmers are:
 Vasiliy Lomachenko
 Ken Norton
 Wilfredo Gomez
 Marvelous Marvin Hagler
 Mike Tyson
 Joe Frazier
 Roberto Duran
 Jack Dempsey
 Henry Armstrong
 Aaron Pryor
 Manny Pacquiao
 Gennady Golovkin
 Canelo Alvarez
 Naoya Inoue
 Tomoki Kameda
 Rocky Marciano
 Floyd Patterson
 Tommy Burns
 Harry Greb
 Tony Galento
 Fighting Harada
 Julio Cesar Chavez Sr.
 Shawn Porter
 David Tua
 Josh Taylor
 Dwight Muhammad Qawi
 Eric "Butterbean" Esch
 Joe Calzaghe
 James Toney
 Winky Wright
 Carmen Basilio
 Miguel Cotto
 Jose Luis Castillo
 Jake LaMotta
 Gervonta Davis
 Micky Ward
 Ricky Hatton
 Brandon Rios
 Antonio Margarito
 Orlando Salido
 David Benavidez
 Leo Santa Cruz
 Marcos Maidana
 Ruslan Provodnikov
 Lucas Matthysse
 Errol Spence Jr.
 Oscar Valdez
 Artur Beterbiev
 Andy Ruiz Jr.
 Dereck Chisora
 Edwin Valero
 Isaac Cruz
 Vergil Ortiz Jr.

Peek-a-Boo — a defense style often used by a fighter where the hands are placed in front of the boxer's face, like in the babies' game of the same name. It offers extra protection to the face and makes it easier to jab the opponent's face.  Peek-a-Boo boxing was developed by legendary trainer Cus D'Amato. Peek‐a‐Boo boxing utilizes relaxed hands with the forearms in front of the face and the fist at nose‐eye level. Other unique features includes side to side head movements, bobbing, weaving and blind siding your opponent. The number system e.g. 3-2-3-Body-head-body or 3-3-2 Body-Body-head is drilled with the stationary dummy and on the bag until the fighter is able to punch by rapid combinations with what D'Amato called "bad intentions." The theory behind the style is that when combined with effective bobbing and weaving head movement, the fighter has a very strong defense and becomes more elusive, able to throw hooks and uppercuts with great effectiveness. Also it allows swift neck movements as well quick duckings and bad returning damage, usually by rising uppercuts or even rising hooks. Since it is a defense designed for close range fighting, it is mainly used by in-fighters. Bobo Olson was the first known champion to use this as a defense.

Commonly known Peek-A-Boo fighters include:
 Mike Tyson
 Floyd Patterson
 Joe Hadley
 José Torres
 Leon Spinks

Out-boxer 
The out-boxer (out-fighter, boxer) is the opposite of the swarmer. The out-boxer seeks to maintain a gap from their opponent and fight with faster, longer range punches. Out-boxers are known for being extremely quick on their feet, which often makes up for a lack of power. Since they rely on the weaker jabs and straights (as opposed to hooks and uppercuts), they tend to win by points decisions rather than by knockout, although some out-boxers can be aggressive and effective punchers. Out-boxers prefer to fight in mid to long-range where they can lure their opponents and frustrate them with counters and accurate long-range blows. Their swiftness and mobility ensure that their opponents can’t land effective blows, especially since out-boxers rarely make risky moves, like fighting from the inside where it’s the most dangerous. The result may end up with the out-boxer out-landing and winning via decision or getting a knock out after exhausting their opponents and finishing them with accurate blows

Commonly known out-boxers are:
 Muhammad Ali
 Jack Johnson
 Floyd Mayweather Jr.
 Sugar Ray Leonard
 Lennox Lewis
 Thomas Hearns
 Wladimir Klitschko
 Jersey Joe Walcott
 Larry Holmes
 Willie Pep
 Gene Tunney
 Paulie Malignaggi
 Chris Algieri
 Shakur Stevenson
 Jimmy Young
 Pernell Whitaker
 Tiger Flowers
 Nicolino Locche
 Winky Wright
 Amir Khan
 Caleb Plant
 Gene Tunney
 Benny Leonard
 Tyson Fury
 Devin Haney
 Dmitry Bivol
 Stephen Fulton (boxer)

Brawler 
If the out-boxer represents everything elegant about boxing, the brawler (slugger, puncher) embodies everything brutal about the sport. Offensively, they possess the best balance and knockout capabilities due to their tendency to plant their feet on the ground while fighting. The most elite sluggers can punch with power from every angle. Some have the ability to corner their opponents to ensure that the latter ones fall prey to their devastating punches. When it comes to defense, they make use of grappling techniques to smother their opponents and leave them vulnerable for power-punches. At the same time, they tend to be the masters of defensive movement in the danger zone of being punched. They apply subtle defensive movements, such as slipping and minimal ducking to reduce the damage they take in punching zones..

Most brawlers lack mobility in the ring and may have difficulty pursuing fighters who are fast on their feet but that is not always the case. Compared to swarmers and out-boxers, brawlers normally throw power shots and rely less on combinations. Brawlers often throw predictable punching patterns (single punches with obvious leads) which can leave them open for counterpunching.

Commonly known brawlers are:
 Joe Louis
 Mike Tyson
 Joe Frazier
 Chris Eubank
 Naseem Hamed
 Thomas Hearns
 Marvelous Marvin Hagler
 Roberto Duran
 Aaron Pryor
 Jack Dempsey
 George Foreman
 Julian Jackson (boxer)
 Gerald McClellan
 Earnie Shavers
 Ron Lyle
 Deontay Wilder
 Stanley Ketchel
 Rocky Graziano
 Jake LaMotta
 Shane Mosley
 Cleveland Williams
 Sonny Liston
 Arturo Gatti
 Vitali Klitschko
 Max Baer
 Gerry Cooney
 Ruslan Provodnikov
 Marcos Maidana
 Ray Mercer
 Frank Bruno
 Tommy Morrison
 Iran Barkley
 Gene Fullmer
 Floyd Patterson
 Rocky Marciano
 Rolando Navarrete
 Terry McGovern
 Eric "Butterbean" Esch
 Brandon Rios
 Antonio Margarito
 David Benavidez
 Lucas Matthysse
 Artur Beterbiev
 John Riel Casimero
 Ilunga Makabu
 Edwin Valero
 Carl Froch
 Vergil Ortiz Jr.

Boxer-puncher 
The boxer-puncher possesses many of the qualities of the out-boxer: hand speed, often an outstanding jab combination, and/or counter-punching skills, better defense and accuracy than a brawler, while possessing brawler-type power. The boxer-puncher may also be more willing to fight in an aggressive swarmer-style than an out-boxer. In general the boxer-puncher lacks the mobility and defensive expertise of the pure boxer. They are the most unpredictable among all 4 boxing styles. They don’t fit in the rock-paper-scissors theory, so how the fight plays out between this style and other styles tends to be unpredictable. A boxer-puncher’s ability to mix things up may prove to be a hindrance to any of the three other boxing styles, but at the same time their versatility means that they tend to be a master of none.

Commonly known boxer-punchers are:
 Evander Holyfield
 Lennox Lewis
 James Toney
 Kid Chocolate
 Roberto Duran
 Ezzard Charles
 Jersey Joe Walcott
 Wilfredo Gomez
 Bob Foster
 Ingemar Johansson
 Max Schmelling
 Bob Fitzsimmons
 Aaron Pryor
 Manny Pacquiao
 Miguel Cotto
 Sugar Ray Robinson
 Marvelous Marvin Hagler
 Joe Louis
 Roy Jones Jr.
 Zab Judah
 Andre Ward
 Joe Calzaghe
 Terence Crawford
 Sugar Ray Leonard
 Bernard Hopkins
 Ricardo "Finito" Lopez
 Carlos Monzon
 Tommy Burns
 Salvador Sanchez
 Gennady Golovkin
 Naoya Inoue
 Canelo Alvarez
 Archie Moore
 Wladimir Klitschko
 Sandy Saddler
 Gabriel "Flash" Elorde
 Sam Langford
 Oscar De La Hoya
 Shane Mosley
 Joe Gans
 Julio Cesar Chavez Sr.
 Alexis Arguello
 Felix Trinidad
 Juan Manuel Marquez
 Marco Antonio Barrera
 Erik Morales
 Ken Norton
 Julian Jackson
 David Benavidez
 Carlos Zarate
 Jimmy Wilde
 Guillermo Rigondeaux
 Nonito Donaire
 Gerry Penalosa
 Sergio Martinez (boxer)
 Tyson Fury
 Jaron Ennis
 Ryan Garcia
 Errol Spence Jr.
 Mikey Garcia
 Danny Garcia
 Vasiliy Lomachenko
 Oleksandr Usyk
 Anthony Joshua
 Jorge Linares
 Dmitry Bivol
 Jermell Charlo
 Keith Thurman

Sub-styles and other categories

Counterpuncher
A counterpuncher utilizes techniques that require the opposing boxer to make a mistake, and then capitalizing on that mistake. A skilled counterpuncher can utilize such techniques as winning rounds with the jab or psychological tactics to entice an opponent to fall into an aggressive style that will exhaust him and leave him open for counterpunches. For these reasons this form of boxing balances defense and offense but can lead to severe damage if the boxer who utilizes this technique has bad reflexes or is not quick enough.

Commonly known counterpunchers are:
 Floyd Mayweather Jr.
 Roberto Duran
 Salvador Sanchez
 Roy Jones Jr.
 Julio Cesar Chavez Sr.
 Canelo Alvarez
 Bernard Hopkins
 Willie Pep
 Errol Spence Jr.
 Juan Manuel Marquez
 Ezzard Charles
 Archie Moore
 Evander Holyfield
 James Toney
 Jersey Joe Walcott
 Charley Burley
 Shakur Stevenson

Southpaw
A southpaw fights with a left-handed fighting stance as opposed to an orthodox fighter who fights right-handed. Orthodox fighters lead and jab from their left side, and southpaw fighters will jab and lead from their right side. Orthodox fighters hook more with their left and cross more with their right, and vice versa for southpaw fighters. Some naturally right-handed fighters (such as Marvin Hagler and Michael Moorer) have converted to southpaw in the past to offset their opponents.

Commonly known southpaw fighters are:
 Marvelous Marvin Hagler (mainly fought Southpaw)
 Manny Pacquiao
 Pernell Whitaker
 Vasiliy Lomachenko 
 Errol Spence Jr.
 Sergio Martinez
 Tiger Flowers
 Hector Camacho
 Oleksandr Usyk
 Gervonta Davis
 Shakur Stevenson
 Joe Calzaghe
 Zab Judah

Switch-hitter
A switch-hitter switches back and forth between a right-handed (orthodox) stance and a left-handed (southpaw) stance on purpose to confuse their opponents in a fight. Right-handed boxers would train in the left-handed (southpaw) stance, while southpaws would train in a right-handed (orthodox) stance, gaining the ability to switch back and forth after much training. A truly ambidextrous boxer can naturally fight in the switch-hitter style without as much training.

Commonly known switch-hitters are:
 Marvelous Marvin Hagler
 Naseem Hamed
 Jaron Ennis
 Terence Crawford

Equipment and safety 

Boxing techniques utilize very forceful strikes with the hand. There are many bones in the hand, and striking surfaces without proper technique can cause serious hand injuries. Today, most trainers do not allow boxers to train and spar without hand/wrist wraps and gloves. Handwraps are used to secure the bones in the hand, and the gloves are used to protect the hands from blunt injury, allowing boxers to throw punches with more force than if they did not utilize them.

Headgear protects against cuts, scrapes, and swelling, but does not protect very well against concussions. Headgear does not sufficiently protect the brain from the jarring that occurs when the head is struck with great force. Also, most boxers aim for the chin on opponents, and the chin is usually not padded. Thus, a powerpunch can do a lot of damage to a boxer, and even a jab that connects to the chin can cause damage, regardless of whether or not headgear is being utilized.

Stances 

In a fully upright stance, the boxer stands with their legs shoulder-width apart and their rear foot a half-step in front of the lead foot. Right-handed or orthodox boxers lead with the left foot and fist (for most penetration power). Both feet are parallel, and the right heel is off the ground. The lead (left) fist is held vertically about six inches in front of the face at eye level. The rear (right) fist is held beside the chin and the elbow tucked against the ribcage to protect the body. The chin is tucked into the chest to avoid punches to the jaw which commonly cause knock-outs and is often kept slightly off-center. Wrists are slightly bent to avoid damage when punching and the elbows are kept tucked in to protect the ribcage. Some boxers fight from a crouch, leaning forward and keeping their feet closer together. The stance described is considered the "textbook" stance and fighters are encouraged to change it around once it's been mastered as a base. Case in point, many fast fighters have their hands down and have almost exaggerated footwork, while brawlers or bully fighters tend to slowly stalk their opponents. In order to retain their stance boxers take 'the first step in any direction with the foot already leading in that direction.'

Different stances allow for bodyweight to be differently positioned and emphasised; this may in turn alter how powerfully and explosively a type of punch can be delivered. For instance, a crouched stance allows for the bodyweight to be positioned further forward over the lead left leg. If a lead left hook is thrown from this position, it will produce a powerful springing action in the lead leg and produce a more explosive punch. This springing action could not be generated effectively, for this punch, if an upright stance was used or if the bodyweight was positioned predominately over the back leg. The preparatory positioning of the bodyweight over the bent lead leg is also known as an isometric preload.

Left-handed or southpaw fighters use a mirror image of the orthodox stance, which can create problems for orthodox fighters unaccustomed to receiving jabs, hooks, or crosses from the opposite side. The southpaw stance, conversely, is vulnerable to a straight right hand.

North American fighters tend to favor a more balanced stance, facing the opponent almost squarely, while many European fighters stand with their torso turned more to the side. The positioning of the hands may also vary, as some fighters prefer to have both hands raised in front of the face, risking exposure to body shots.

Punching 

The four basic punches in modern boxing are the jab, the cross, the hook, and the uppercut.

 Jab — a quick, straight punch thrown with the lead hand from the guard position. The jab extends from the side of the torso and typically does not pass in front of it. It is accompanied by a small, clockwise rotation of the torso and hips, while the fist rotates 90 degrees, becoming horizontal upon impact. As the punch reaches full extension, the lead shoulder is brought up to guard the chin. The rear hand remains next to the face to guard the jaw. After making contact with the target, the lead hand is retracted quickly to resume a guard position in front of the face. The jab is the most important punch in a boxer's arsenal because it provides a fair amount of its own cover and it leaves the least amount of space for a counter‐punch from the opponent. It has the longest reach of any punch and does not require commitment or large weight transfers. Due to its relatively weak power, the jab is often used as a tool to gauge distances, probe an opponent's defenses, and set up heavier, more powerful punches. A half‐step may be added, moving the entire body into the punch, for additional power. Despite its lack of power, the jab is the most important punch in boxing, usable not only for attack but also defense, as a good quick, stiff jab can interrupt a much more powerful punch, such as a hook or uppercut.
 Cross — a powerful straight punch thrown with the rear hand. From the guard position, the rear hand is thrown from the chin, crossing the body and traveling towards the target in a straight line. The rear shoulder is thrust forward and finishes just touching the outside of the chin. At the same time, the lead hand is retracted and tucked against the face to protect the inside of the chin. For additional power, the torso and hips are rotated counter‐clockwise as the cross is thrown. Weight is also transferred from the rear foot to the lead foot, resulting in the rear heel turning outwards as it acts as a fulcrum for the transfer of weight. Like the jab, a half‐step forward may be added. After the cross is thrown, the hand is retracted quickly and the guard position resumed. When the same punch is used to counter a jab, aiming for the opponent's head it is called a "cross". The straight sets up the lead hook well. The Cross can also follow a jab, creating the classic "one-two combo." 
 Hook — a semi-circular punch thrown with the lead hand to the side of the opponent's head. From the guard position, the elbow is drawn back with a horizontal fist (knuckles pointing forward) and the elbow bent. The rear hand is tucked firmly against the jaw to protect the chin. The torso and hips are rotated clockwise, propelling the fist through a tight, clockwise arc across the front of the body and connecting with the target. At the same time, the lead foot pivots clockwise, turning the left heel outwards. Upon contact, the hook's circular path ends abruptly and the lead hand is pulled quickly back into the guard position. A hook may also target the lower body (the classic Mexican hook to the liver) and this technique is sometimes called the "rip" to distinguish it from the conventional hook to the head. The hook may also be thrown with the rear hand.
 Uppercut — a vertical, rising punch thrown with the rear hand. From the guard position, the torso shifts slightly to the right, the rear hand drops below the level of the opponent's chest and the knees are bent slightly. From this position, the rear hand is thrust upwards in a rising arc towards the opponent's chin or torso. At the same time, the knees push upwards quickly and the torso and hips rotate counter‐clockwise and the rear heel turns outward, mimicking the body movement of the cross. The strategic utility of the uppercut depends on its ability to "lift" the opponent's body, setting it off-balance for successive attacks.
 Short straight-punch usually striking to the chin
 Cross-counter is a counterpunch begun immediately after an opponent throws a jab, exploiting the opening in the opponent's position.

Less common punches 
Bolo punch : Occasionally seen in Olympic boxing, the bolo is an arm punch which owes its power to the shortening of a circular arc rather than to transference of body weight; it tends to have more of an effect due to the surprise of the odd angle it lands at rather than the actual power of the punch. 

 Overhand right : The overhand right has a looping circular arc as it is thrown over-the-shoulder with the palm facing away from the boxer. It is especially popular with smaller stature boxers trying to reach taller opponents.
 Check hook : A check hook is employed to prevent aggressive boxers from lunging in. There are two parts to the check hook. The first part consists of a regular hook. As the opponent lunges in, the boxer should throw the hook and pivot on his left foot and swing his right foot 180 degrees around. If executed correctly, the aggressive boxer will lunge in and sail harmlessly past his opponent like a bull missing a matador.
Haymaker :The Haymaker is a wide angle punch similar to a hook, but instead of getting power from body rotation, it gets its power from its large loop. It is considered an unsophisticated punch, and leaves one open to a counter.

Defense 

Bob and Weave — bobbing moves the head laterally and beneath an incoming punch. As the opponent's punch arrives, the boxer bends the legs quickly and simultaneously shifts the body either slightly right or left. Once the punch has been evaded, the boxer "weaves" back to an upright position, emerging on either the outside or inside of the opponent's still-extended arm. To move outside the opponent's extended arm is called "bobbing to the outside". To move inside the opponent's extended arm is called "bobbing to the inside".

Parry/Block — parrying or blocking uses the boxer's hands as defensive tools to deflect incoming attacks. As the opponent's punch arrives, the boxer delivers a sharp, lateral, open-handed blow to the opponent's wrist or forearm, redirecting the punch.
The Cover‐up – covering up is the last opportunity to avoid an incoming strike to an unprotected face or body. Generally speaking, the hands are held high to protect the head and chin and the forearms are tucked against the torso to impede body shots. When protecting the body, the boxer rotates the hips and lets incoming punches "roll" off the guard. To protect the head, the boxer presses both fists against the front of the face with the forearms parallel and facing outwards. This type of guard is weak against attacks from below.
The Clinch – clinching is a rough form of grappling and occurs when the distance between both fighters has closed and straight punches cannot be employed. In this situation, the boxer attempts to hold or "tie up" the opponent's hands so he is unable to throw hooks or uppercuts. To perform a clinch, the boxer loops both hands around the outside of the opponent's shoulders, scooping back under the forearms to grasp the opponent's arms tightly against his own body. In this position, the opponent's arms are pinned and cannot be used to attack. Clinching is a temporary match state and is quickly dissipated by the referee.

There are 3 main defensive positions (guards or styles) used in boxing:

All fighters have their own variations to these styles. Some fighters may have their guard higher for more head protection while others have their guard lower to provide better protection against body punches. Many fighters don't strictly use a single position, but rather adapt to the situation when choosing a certain position to protect them.

 Sway or fade – To anticipate a punch and move the upper body or head back so that it misses or has its force appreciably lessened. Also called "rolling with the punch" or " Riding The Punch.
Peek-a-Boo — a defense style often used by a fighter where the hands are placed in front of the boxer's face, like in the babies' game of the same name. It offers extra protection to the face and makes it easier to jab the opponent's face.  Peek-a-Boo boxing was developed by legendary trainer Cus D'Amato. Peek‐a‐Boo boxing utilizes relaxed hands with the forearms in front of the face and the fist at nose‐eye level. Other unique features includes side to side head movements, bobbing, weaving and blind siding your opponent. The number system e.g. 3-2-3-Body-head-body or 3-3-2 Body-Body-head is drilled with the stationary dummy and on the bag until the fighter is able to punch by rapid combinations with what D'Amato called "bad intentions." The theory behind the style is that when combined with effective bobbing and weaving head movement, the fighter has a very strong defense and becomes more elusive, able to throw hooks and uppercuts with great effectiveness. Also it allows swift neck movements as well quick duckings and bad returning damage, usually by rising uppercuts or even rising hooks. Since it is a defense designed for close range fighting, it is mainly used by in-fighters. Bobo Olson was the first known champion to use this as a defense.

Commonly known Peek-A-Boo fighters include:
 Mike Tyson
 Floyd Patterson
 José Torres
 Leon Spinks 

Cross-armed — the forearms are placed on top of each other horizontally in front of the face with the glove of one arm being on the top of the elbow of the other arm. This style is greatly varied when the back hand (right for an orthodox fighter and left for a southpaw) rises vertically. This style is the most effective for reducing head damage. The only head punch that a fighter is susceptible to is a jab to the top of the head. The body is open, but most fighters who use this style bend and lean to protect the body, but while upright and unaltered the body is there to be hit. This position is very difficult to counterpunch from, but virtually eliminates all head damage.

Commonly known Cross-Armed fighters include:
 Archie Moore
 George Foreman (In his comeback)
 Gene Fullmer

Philly Shell or Shoulder Roll — this is actually a variation of the cross-arm. The lead arm (left for an orthodox fighter and right for a southpaw) is placed across the torso usually somewhere in between the belly button and chest and the lead hand rests on the opposite side of the fighter's torso. The back hand is placed on the side of the face (right side for orthodox fighters and left side for southpaws). The lead shoulder is brought in tight against the side of the face (left side for orthodox fighters and right side for southpaws). This style is used by fighters who like to counterpunch. To execute this guard a fighter must be very athletic and experienced. This style is so effective for counterpunching because it allows fighters to slip punches by rotating and dipping their upper body and causing blows to glance off the fighter. After the punch glances off, the fighter's back hand is in perfect position to hit their out‐of‐position opponent. The shoulder lean is used in this stance. To execute the shoulder lean a fighter rotates and ducks (to the right for orthodox fighters and to the left for southpaws) when their opponents punch is coming towards them and then rotates back towards their opponent while their opponent is bringing their hand back. The fighter will throw a punch with their back hand as they are rotating towards their undefended opponent. The weakness to this style is that when a fighter is stationary and not rotating they are open to be hit so a fighter must be athletic and well conditioned to effectively execute this style. To beat this style, fighters like to jab their opponents shoulder causing the shoulder and arm to be in pain and to demobilize that arm. But if mastered and perfected it is an effective way to play defense in the sport of boxing.

Commonly known Philly Shell fighters include:
 James Toney
 Floyd Mayweather Jr.
 George Benton
 Charley Burley
 Jack Dempsey
 Leon Spinks 
 Dwight Muhammad Qawi

References

External links 
Different Boxing Stances at Livestrong
Boxing Styles: Swarmer, Slugger, Boxer, Boxer-Puncher
Is Boxing Good For Self Defense? Pros And Cons Of Boxing

Boxing